Bruno Delmaestro is an Italian-Canadian figure skating coach and former competitor. He is the 1982 Nebelhorn Trophy silver medalist, the 1982 Grand Prix International St. Gervais bronze medalist, and a three-time Italian national champion. He competed at four European Championships and the 1982 World Championships.

Delmaestro is a longtime coach at the Coquitlam Skating Club in Coquitlam, British Columbia, Canada. He coached Hong Kong's Ronald Lam throughout Lam's entire career.

His daughter, Brianna, was born in November 1995 in Burnaby and competed for Canada in ice dancing.

Competitive highlights

References

External links 
 

1963 births
Italian male single skaters
Italian emigrants to Canada
Living people
Place of birth missing (living people)
People from Coquitlam